Ente Neelakaasham is a 1979 Indian Malayalam film, directed by Thoppil Bhasi. The film stars Shobha, Sukumaran, Sankaradi and Sreelatha Namboothiri in the lead roles.  It won the Kerala State Film Award for Best Actress for Shobha. The film has musical score by K. Raghavan.

Cast

Shobha as Malathy
Sukumaran as Shekharan
Sankaradi as Raghava Panikker
Sreelatha Namboothiri as Chelamma
Bahadoor as Naanu
K. P. Ummer as Keshava Pilla
KPAC Premachandran as Rajan
KPAC Sunny as Sankaran Nair
Meena as Devaki
Ravi Menon as Chandran
Thodupuzha Vasanthi as Madhavi
Thoppil Krishna Pillai as Vaidyan
KPAC Khan

Soundtrack
The music was composed by K. Raghavan and the lyrics were written by O. N. V. Kurup.

References

External links
 

1979 films
1970s Malayalam-language films
Films directed by Thoppil Bhasi